Isidro Gomá y Tomás (19 August 1869  – 22 August 1940) was the Bishop of Tarazona in the province of Zaragoza known for his strong support of Francisco Franco and the National Movement during the Spanish Civil War from 1936 to 1939. He was also later made Cardinal and Archbishop of Toledo and was Primate of Spain.
 Gomá was an integrista, in the technical sense in believing in the necessity of a 'Confessional State' that imposes upon all its subjects the profession and practice of the Roman Catholic religion and prohibits all others.  

At the end of the Spanish Civil War he wrote; "The Church has applied the full weight of her prestige, which has been placed at the service of truth and justice, to bring about the triumph of the National Cause."

Isidro Gomá y Tomás was born in the Catalan town of La Riba, Spain. He was educated at the Seminary of Tarragona, and the Seminary of Valencia.

Priesthood
He was ordained on 8 June 1895 in Tarragona. He did pastoral work in the archdiocese of Tarragona until 1897 after which he worked as a faculty member of the Pontifical Seminary of Tarragona from 1897 until 1899. He served as its rector until 1906. He was also a faculty member of the Pontifical University of Tarragona from 1897 until 1899. He worked in the diocesan curia until 1927.

Episcopate

He was appointed as bishop of Tarazona on 20 June 1927 by Pope Pius XI. He was appointed as apostolic administrator of Tudela from December 1927 until June 1933. He was promoted to the metropolitan and primatial see of Toledo on 12 April 1933.

Cardinalate
He was created Cardinal-Priest of San Pietro in Montorio in the consistory of 16 December 1935 by Pope Pius XI. He strongly supported the National Movement during the Spanish Civil War from 1936 to 1939. He participated in the conclave of 1939 that elected Pope Pius XII. He died in 1940. 

In 1938, when it was evident that the Nationalists had the upper hand, Gomá made it clear that reconciliation was not forthcoming and contributed to the fervor of White Terror: "Indeed, it is necessary to end the war. But do not let it end with a compromise, with an agreement nor with reconciliation. It is necessary to take hostilities to the point of achieving victory at the point of a sword.  Let the reds surrender, since they have been beaten. There is no pacification possible other than through arms. In order to organise peace within a Christian constitution it is vital to uproot all the rot of secular legislation."
His fiery preaching, including exhortations to massacre the "reds" and his repeated benedictions of Franco's guns and tanks, were loudly shamed by Catholic French writer Georges Bernanos, then a right wing sympathiser, in his book "Les grands cimetières sous la lune" (The great graveyards under the moonlight), a first-hand account, with pamphletary overtones, of the Spanish Civil War which he witnessed in the Balearic island of Mallorca.

According to Antony Beevor: Cardinal Gomá stated that 'Jews and Masons poisoned the national soul with absurd doctrine'... A few brave priests put their lives at risk by criticizing nationalist atrocities, but the majority of the clergy in nationalist areas revelled in their new-found power and the increased size of their congregations. Anyone who did not attend Mass faithfully was likely to be suspected of 'red' tendencies. Entrepreneurs made a great money selling religious symbols... It was reminiscent of the way the Inquisition's persecutions of Jews and Moors helped make pork such an important part of the Spanish diet.

Notes

1869 births
1940 deaths
People from Alt Camp
20th-century Spanish cardinals
Archbishops of Toledo
Acción Española
Bishops of Tarazona